A market analysis studies the attractiveness and the dynamics of a special market within a special industry. It is part of the industry analysis and thus in turn of the global environmental analysis. Through all of these analyses the strengths, weaknesses, opportunities and threats (SWOT) of a company can be identified. Finally, with the help of a SWOT analysis, adequate business strategies of a company will be defined.  The market analysis is also known as a documented investigation of a market that is used to inform a firm's planning activities, particularly around decisions of inventory, purchase, work force expansion/contraction, facility expansion, purchases of capital equipment, promotional activities, and many other aspects of a company.

Market segmentation
Market segmentation is the basis for a differentiated market analysis. Differentiation is important. One main reason is the saturation of consumption, which exists due to the increasing competition in offered products. Consumers ask for more individual products and services and are better informed about the range of products than before. As a consequence, market segmentation is necessary.   Segmentation includes a lot of market research, since a lot of market knowledge is required to segment the market. Market research about market structures and processes must be done to define the “relevant market”.  The relevant market is an integral part of the whole market, on which the company focuses its activities. To identify and classify the relevant market, a market classification or segmentation has to be done.

Dimensions of market analysis

The goal of a market analysis is to determine the attractiveness of a market, both now and in the future.  Organizations evaluate the future attractiveness of a market by gaining an understanding of evolving opportunities and threats as they relate to that organization's own strengths and weaknesses.

Organizations use the finding to guide the investment decisions they make to advance their success. The findings of a market analysis may motivate an organization to change various aspects of its investment strategy. Affected areas may include inventory levels, a work force expansion/contraction, facility expansion, purchases of capital equipment, and promotional activities.

Elements

Market size
The market size is defined through the market volume and the market potential. The market volume exhibits the totality of all realized sales volume of a special market. The volume is therefore dependent on the quantity of consumers and their ordinary demand. Furthermore, the market volume is either measured in quantities or qualities. The quantities can be given in technical terms, like GW for power capacities, or in numbers of items. Qualitative measuring mostly uses the sales turnover as an indicator. That means that the market price and the quantity are taken into account. Besides the market volume, the market potential is of equal importance. It defines the upper limit of the total demand and takes potential clients into consideration. Although the market potential is rather fictitious, it offers good values of orientation. The relation of market volume to market potential provides information about the chances of market growth.
The following are examples of information sources for determining market size:

 Government data
 Trade association data
 Financial data from major players
 Customer surveys

Market trends
Market trends are the upward or downward movement of a market, during a period of time. The market size is more difficult to estimate if one is starting with something completely new. In this case, you will have to derive the figures from the number of potential customers, or customer segments.

Besides information about the target market, one also needs information about one's competitors, customers, products, etc. Lastly, you need to measure marketing effectiveness. A few techniques are:

Customer analysis
Choice modelling
Competitor analysis
Risk analysis
Product research
Advertising the research
Marketing mix modeling
Simulated Test Marketing[5]

Changes in the market are important because they often are the source of new opportunities and threats. Moreover, they have the potential to dramatically affect the market size.

Examples include changes in economic, social, regulatory, legal, and political conditions and in available technology, price sensitivity, demand for variety, and level of emphasis on service and support.

Market opportunity

A market opportunity product or a service, based on either one technology or several, fulfills the need(s) of a (preferably increasing) market better than the competition and better than substitution-technologies within the given environmental frame (e.g. society, politics, legislation, etc.).

Applications
The literature defines several areas in which market analysis is important. These include: sales forecasting, market research, and marketing strategy.  Not all managers will need to conduct a market analysis.  Nevertheless, it would be important for managers that use market analysis data to know how analysts derive their conclusions and what techniques they use to do so.

References

 George J. Kress,Taryn Webb, and John Snyder, Forecasting and Market Analysis Techniques: A Practical Approach (Westport, CT: Quorum Books, 1994)

See also
Market research
Marketing strategy

Market research
Business process